Australian heavy metal band Northlane has released six studio albums, four EPs, two live album, twenty singles and twenty-one music videos.

Albums

Studio albums

Live albums

Extended plays

Singles

As featured artist

Album appearances

Music videos

Notes

References

External links
 
 Northlane discography at AllMusic
 Northlane discography at Discogs
 Northlane discography at MusicBrainz

Discographies of Australian artists
Heavy metal group discographies